Maria Elisabeth of Bavaria (9 September 1914 – 13 May 2011), nicknamed "Empress-mother", was a member of Brazilian imperial family from 1937 to 1981, by her marriage to Pedro Henrique of Brazil. His son Bertrand of Brazil is the current head of the Imperial House of Brazil, position that has already been held by his other son Luiz Gastão of Brazil and her husband. It was also grandmother of Rafael, Amélia, Pedro Luiz and Maria Gabriela children of Antônio of Brazil. If Brazil had quantified to be a monarchy she would have been the Empress Consort of Brazil from 1937 to 1981, was the eldest daughter of Prince Franz of Bavaria, third son of Ludwig III of Bavaria.

Early life

Princess Maria Elisabeth of Bavaria was born at Nymphenburg Palace, Munich, Kingdom of Bavaria, the second child and first daughter of Prince Franz of Bavaria (1875–1957), (son of Ludwig III of Bavaria and Archduchess Maria Theresa of Austria-Este) and his wife, Princess Isabella Antonie of Croÿ (1890–1982), (daughter of Karl Alfred, Duke of Croÿ and Princess Ludmilla of Arenberg).

Princess Maria Elisabeth was born at the beginning of First World War; most of her relatives fought during the war, even her father. Her childhood and youth were very troubled because of the regimes that were established in Germany after the war.

Until coming of age the princess lived  in Sárvár Castle, in Hungary, which was owned by her grandmother, Queen Maria Teresa, a born Archduchess of Austria, Princess of Hungary and of Modena, among others. The Bavarian Royal Family returned to Bavaria in the 1930s. The republican government was forced to return a substantial part of goods and castles that had been confiscated in 1918 after the revolution.

The times in Germany between the wars (1918–1938) were difficult, due to the Great Depression of 1929 and the rise of the Nazis, and Adolf Hitler in the German government. The uncle of the princess, Rupprecht (1869–1955), head of the Royal House of Bavaria, declared himself an enemy of Hitler. This fact had a huge impact on the Royal Family; they were forced to flee to Italy. The second wife of Prince Rupprecht, Princess Antonia of Luxembourg (1899–1955), and her children, however, were captured by the Nazis, while Rupprecht, still in Italy, evaded arrest.  They were imprisoned at Sachsenhausen.  Although liberated that very same month, the imprisonment greatly impaired Antonia's health, and she died nine years later, at Lenzerheide, Switzerland.

Princess Maria Elisabeth received education from her parents, as  well as  schooling in the art of painting.  The Princess specialized in porcelain painting, a traditional art of Bavaria.

Marriage and departure to Brazil

On 19 August 1937 Princess Maria Elisabeth married Pedro Henrique of Orléans-Braganza, head of one of the branches of the Imperial House of Brazil. The wedding took place in the chapel of Nymphenburg Palace.

The couple lived first in France; although they made numerous attempts to immigrate to Brazil,  they were prevented by World War II.  It was not until 1945 that the family was able to move. First, they settled in the Palace of Grão-Pará, in Petrópolis, Rio de Janeiro, and later in a house of the neighborhood of Retiro. In 1951, Pedro Henrique acquired the Fazenda Santa Maria, in Jacarezinho, Paraná, where the family lived until 1964. In 1965, the family moved to Vassouras, within the state of Rio de Janeiro.

Widowhood
In 1981, Pedro Henrique died at Vassouras and his eldest son became the Head of the Vassouras branch of the Imperial House of Brazil. Maria Elisabeth's life was divided between Santa Maria and her daughter Isabel's apartment in the district of Lagoa, Rio de Janeiro. She frequently visited Bavaria and Belgium, where her other daughters resided.

In 2004, a Mass honoring her 90th birthday was celebrated by the abbot emeritus of St. Benedict of Rio de Janeiro, Jose Palmeiro Mendes, and co-celebrated by priests Sérgio Costa Couto, judge of the Ecclesiastical Tribunal of the Archdiocese of Rio de Janeiro and chaplain of the Glory of the Outeiro, and Jorge Luis Pereira da Silva at the Church of Imperial Brotherhood of Nossa Senhora da Glória do Outeiro, in Rio de Janeiro. It was attended by all of her children and numerous grandchildren, making the event noteworthy enough to be reported on by Brazilian media.

Children and descendants
 Luiz Gastão Maria Jose Pio de Orléans-Bragança e Wittelsbach (6 June 1938 in Mandelieu-la-Napoule - 15 July 2022 in São Paulo),former head of the Imperial House of Brazil (according to the Vassouras branch). Unmarried and without issue.
 Eudes Maria Ranieri Pedro José de Orléans-Bragança e Wittelsbach (8 June 1939 in Mandelieu-la-Napoule - 13 August 2020 in Rio de Janeiro), married firstly on 14 May 1967 in São Paulo, Ana Maria de Cerqueira César Moraes de Barros (born 20 November 1945 in São Paulo). They were divorced in 1976. They have two children (including the Brazilian politician Luiz Philippe de Orléans e Bragança). He remarried on 26 March 1976 in Rio de Janeiro, Mercedes Willemsens Neves da Rocha (born 26 January 1955 in Petrópolis). They have four children.
 Bertrand Maria José Pio Januaria de Orléans-Bragança e Wittelsbach (born 2 February 1941 in Mandelieu-la-Napoule), current head of the Imperial House of Brazil (according to the Vassouras branch). Unmarried and without issue.
 Isabel Maria Josefa Henriqueta Francisca de Orléans-Bragança e Wittelsbach (4 April 1944 in La Bourboule – 5 November 2017 in Rio de Janeiro). Died unmarried and without issue.
 Pedro de Alcántara Henrique Maria Miguel Gabriel Rafael Gonzaga de Orléans-Bragança e Wittelsbach (born 1 December 1945 in Petrópolis), married on 4 July 1974 in Rio de Janeiro, Maria de Fátima Baptista de Oliveira Rocha (born 14 July 1952 in Rio de Janeiro). They have five children.
 Fernando Diniz Maria José Miguel Gabriel Rafael Gonzaga de Orléans-Bragança e Wittelsbach (born 2 February 1948 in Petrópolis), married on 19 March 1975 in Rio de Janeiro, Maria de Graça de Siqueira Carvalho Baere de Araújo (born 27 June 1952 in Rio de Janeiro).
 Antônio João Maria José Jorge Miguel Gabriel Rafael Gonzaga de Orléans-Bragança e Wittelsbach (born 24 June 1950 in Rio de Janeiro), married on 25 September 1981 in Belœil, Princess Christine de Ligne (born 11 August 1955 in Belœil), daughter of Antoine, 13th Prince of Ligne, and Princess Alix of Luxembourg. They have four children. Prince Imperial of Brazil (according to the Vassouras branch).
 Eleonora Maria Josefa Rosa Filipa Miguela Gabriela Rafaela Gonzaga de Orléans-Bragança e Wittelsbach (born 20 May 1953 in Jacarezinho), married on 10 March 1981 in Rio de Janeiro, Michel, 14th Prince of Ligne (born 26 May 1951 in Belœil), son of Antoine, 13th Prince of Ligne, and Princess Alix of Luxembourg. They have two children.
 Francisco Maria José Rasso Miguel Gabriel Rafael Gonzaga de Orléans-Bragança e Wittelsbach (born 6 April 1955 in Jacarezinho), married on 28 December 1980 in Rio de Janeiro, Cláudia Regina Lisboa Martins Godinho (born 11 July 1954 in Rio de Janeiro). They have three daughters.
 Alberto Maria José João Miguel Gabriel Rafael Gonzaga de Orléans-Bragança e Wittelsbach (born 23 June 1957 in Jundiaí do Sul), married on 11 January 1983 in Rio de Janeiro, Maritza Bulcão Ribas Bockel (born 29 April 1961 in Rio de Janeiro). They have four children.
 Maria Teresa Aldegunda Luiza Josefa Micaela Gabriela Rafaela Gonzaga de Orléans-Bragança e Wittelsbach (born 14 July 1959 in Jundiaí do Sul), married on 4 November 1995 in Rio de Janeiro, Johannes Hessel de Jong (born 5 March 1954 in Joure). They have two children.
 Maria Gabriela Dorotèa Isabel Josefa Micaela Gabriela Rafaela Gonzaga de Orléans-Bragança e Wittelsbach (born 14 July 1959 in Jundiaí do Sul), married on 20 December 2003 in Teresópolis, Theodore Senna de Hungria da Silva Machado (born 12 July 1954 in Petrópolis). They were divorced in 2005. She remarried João Marcos Pilli.

Honors
  House of Wittelsbach – Order of Saint Elizabeth
  House of Wittelsbach – Order of Theresa
  House of Bourbon-Two Sicilies – Grand Cross of the Sacred Military Constantinian Order of Saint George 
  Sovereign Military Order of Malta – Dame of Justice

Ancestry

Notes

Sources
Imperial House of Brazil (Portuguese)
The Royal House of Stuart, London, 1969, 1971, 1976, Addington, A. C., Reference: page 78.

|-

1914 births
2011 deaths
Nobility from Munich
House of Wittelsbach
House of Orléans-Braganza
Bavarian princesses
People from Vassouras